"Just a Song Before I Go" is a song by Crosby, Stills and Nash that appeared on the 1977 album CSN. It was also released as a single and reached number 7 on the Billboard Hot 100 for two consecutive weeks ending August 27 and September 3, 1977, becoming the band's highest-charting hit.  It is also one of the band's shortest songs, with a running time of only 2:14.  In Canada, it peaked at number 10.

Background
The song was written by Graham Nash about leaving loved ones behind before going on a concert tour. It was written in Hawaii in about 20 minutes at the piano while Nash and Leslie Morris were staying with a friend, later revealed to be a rather "low-level drug dealer". Nash had a little while to get to the airport to head back to his home in Los Angeles. The dealer queried Nash something along the lines of "You're a big shot song writer, I bet you can't write a song just before you go." After Nash asking how much the dealer was betting, he responded $500. In a February 25, 2016, interview on The Late Show with Stephen Colbert, Nash stated that he still has that $500. This song came in the nick of time, because an upcoming hurricane was about to wreak havoc on the island.

Billboard praised the "hypnotically soothing orchestration" and the vocal harmonies.  Cash Box said that "an unmistakable vocal blend and Stephen Stills' smooth electric guitar licks are here" and called the melody "gentle."  Record World called it "a quiet, melodic song with a dreamy air."

Crosby, Stills and Nash arranged "Just a Song Before I Go" as a straight ballad, with mostly acoustic textures anchored by two electric guitar solos from Stephen Stills.

Personnel
 David Crosby – vocals, acoustic guitar
 Stephen Stills – vocals, electric guitar
 Graham Nash – vocals, piano

Additional musicians
 Joe Vitale – electric piano
 Tim Drummond – bass
 Russ Kunkel – drums, percussion

Charts

Cover versions
In 2008, drummer Russ Kunkel and the group Chateau Beach covered the song on their album "Rivage."

References

Other sources
 Liner notes from the 1991 box set Crosby, Stills and Nash: CSN. The commentary on the songs's genesis is from David Crosby.

1977 songs
Crosby, Stills, Nash & Young songs
Songs written by Graham Nash
Atlantic Records singles